Revelation Nausea is the third album by Swedish death metal band Vomitory. It was released in 2001 on Metal Blade.

Track listing 
 "Revelation Nausea" – 3:16
 "The Corpsegrinder Experience" – 4:20
 "Beneath the Soil" – 4:56
 "Under Clouds of Blood" – 2:42
 "The Art of War" – 4:01
 "When Silence Conquers" – 6:22
 "Chapter of Pain" – 3:34
 "The Holocaust" – 4:05
 "Exhaling Life" – 3:37
 "9mm Salvation" – 2:38

Personnel
 Erik Rundqvist – bass guitar, vocals
 Tobias Gustafsson – drums
 Ulf Dalegren – guitar
 Urban Gustafsson – guitar
Cliff – vocals ("The Art of War")
Vomitory – production
Henrik Larsson – production
Göran Finnberg – mastering (at The Mastering Room)
Peter Wallgren – cover art
Micke Sörensen – photography

References 

2001 albums
Vomitory (band) albums
Metal Blade Records albums